Torkan (also Romanized as Torkān; also known as Tarkūn and Torkan Abad) is a village in Dehaj Rural District, Dehaj District, Shahr-e Babak County, Kerman Province, Iran. At the 2006 census, its population was 50, in 14 families.

References 

Populated places in Shahr-e Babak County